Tuqiao is a station on the  of the Beijing Subway. It opened on December 27, 2003.

Tuqiao is on the eastern stretch of the 5th Ring Road and there is an exit there.

Station Layout 
The station has 2 at-grade side platforms.

Exits 
There are 3 exits, lettered A, B, and C. Exit A is accessible.

References

External links

Beijing Subway stations in Tongzhou District
Railway stations in China opened in 2003